Flyball is a dog sport in which teams of dogs race against each other from the start to the finish line, over a line of hurdles, to a box that releases a tennis ball to be caught when the dog presses the spring-loaded pad, then back to their handlers while carrying the ball.

Flyball is run in teams of four dogs, as a relay. The hurdle height is determined by the ulna's length or the smallest dog's shoulder height on the team (depending on the association).

Current EFC (European Flyball Championship) rules limit the height to no less than 17.5 cm and no greater than 35 cm. Each dog must return its ball all the way across the start line before the next dog crosses. Ideal running is nose-to-nose at the start line. The first team to have all four dogs cross the finish line error free wins the heat. Penalties are applied to teams if the ball is dropped or if the next relay dog is released early.

History 

Flyball started as a dog sport in the late 1960s and early 1970s in Southern California. Some dog trainers combined scent hurdle racing with the dogs bringing back a tennis ball to the finish line. Then a tennis ball-launching apparatus was added, and the first flyball box was born. Herbert Wagner is credited with making the first real flyball box, and he also demonstrated flyball on The Tonight Show Starring Johnny Carson.

The first flyball tournament was held in 1983 in the United States.

Flyball has now expanded into many countries, including Australia, Canada and South Africa, and in European countries such as Belgium, Czech Republic, Finland, Germany, the Netherlands, Poland, Austria, Hungary, France and the United Kingdom have national flyball tournaments and also hold joint annual European championships.

The European championships, which are the largest international Flyball championships, were held in the United Kingdom in 2007 and 2012, the Czech Republic in 2008; Poland in 2018; Belgium in 2009, 2010 and 2013; Germany in 2011, 2015 and 2019; and France in 2014.

Nature of the sport 

Flyball provides an entertaining and active way to interact with one's dog and other dog enthusiasts in an enjoyable environment while allowing the dogs exercise and enjoyment. It is an especially effective way to burn off dogs' energy with a high drive to work, such as Border Collies and Staffordshire Bull Terriers.

A large part of flyball's popularity stems from the fact that it is one of the competition activities available to mixed-breed dogs, allowing rescued mutts and non-pedigree dogs to shine alongside their purebred canine counterparts. Though herding dogs currently dominate the courses, many champion teams have mutts on them. Dogs earn titles and awards based on points earned by their team in racing.

As the sport has developed, better dog training regimes have been introduced as knowledge has increased within the sport. Specific training has been developed to promote the dogs using the ‘swimmers’ type turns on the Flyball box when catching the ball and turning.

Flyball is not limited to the breed's size, as smaller dogs such as Patterdale Terriers, Jack Russell Terriers, Whippets and even miniature poodles, often compete with great success in mixed-breed teams (teams consisting of dogs of various sizes and breeds). Smaller dogs are often prized as the hurdle height is based on the height of the smallest dog in the team, commonly known as a height dog. Their only limitation is whether they can trigger the release pad, and small dogs often have to fully jump on it to do so.

Flyball is one of the non-hunting dog sports in which dogs and people work as a team. Many casual pet owners use their flyball time more as a way to relax and socialize with other dog owners than as a competition, and many champion flyball dogs are essentially pet dogs with a hobby, rather than dedicated sporting or working dogs. On the other hand, modern flyball has become the fastest-growing team sport, a sport for dogs, handlers and coaches. First division teams have well-trained dogs and handlers and are trained and coached to perform. Some teams use dedicated specially bred sport dogs.

Competitions

Competitions are usually hosted by a specific local flyball club but under the sanction of a national governing body. The host club may be devoted solely to flyball or to many other types of dog sports. The host flyball club uses Head judges who are licensed by the national sanctioning organization and the club will apply to the national sanctioning organization for permission to hold a competition on a specific date or weekend; most competitions are two-day weekend events.

Although competitions may vary, teams are normally seeded into divisions against other teams of similar speed. This allows the races to be closer and much more exciting. Each team in the division will usually race against all the other teams in a round robin format. The overall winner is the team with the most wins in a race.

In competitions all teams will also be trying to improve their own individual team's best race time. Teams that underestimate their speed may "break out" of their division in competition. The break-out time for a division is typically set at 1 second faster than the top seeded team in each division. The break-out rule is intended to encourage teams to seed themselves accurately, as any heats where a team breaks out do not count and are recorded as losses.

The largest single regularly held flyball competition is the North American Flyball Championships which is called the CanAm Classic. In the 2009 Championships there were about 300 teams competing held over a 3-day event.

U-Fli hosts their Tournament of Champions at Purina Farms. A slightly smaller scale to NAFA's CanAm Classic, it hosts over 100 teams and runs 3 to 4 rings of races over the course of 3 days.

Technology 
While flyball tournaments can be run manually utilizing stopwatches and line judges, electronic systems to facilitate accurate judging are the norm. NAFA refers to their system as the Electronic Judging System. U-FLI refers to their system as the Digital Scoring System.

These systems are similar in nature, with the following primary components: A light tree to indicate the countdown to race start, optical gates positioned at the start/finish line to detect line faults, and a high-precision digital clock to time the race.

Pass Calling 
Flyball teams with fast dogs and tight passes run into the limits of human perception when it comes to accurate estimation of the distance between the dogs when the returning dog passes through the plane of the start/finish line.

Some teams use digital video cameras to record the pass, and then review frame-by-frame to develop an estimate of distance, but the traditional frame rate of 30 frames per second (FPS) can present a problem in that it is unlikely to capture a frame of the exact moment the returning dog breaches the plane of the start/finish line. More recently, high-speed consumer cameras such as the Casio Exilim EX-FH100 have been used to record video at much higher frame rates.

Some teams have started using software designed for other sports, such as the cSwing Golf Analysis tool, to aid in the capture and review of high speed camera footage of flyball passes.

Fastest recorded singles time 

Fume (owned and trained by Barbara Bunday) from Paws on the Run flyball team from Leicestershire UK recorded a time of 3.40 seconds, recorded at Horseley Fen 31 December 2021.

National Record Times 

Australian

 The current AFA record is 15.987 seconds and is held by Norwest Thunderdogs 1 (set at Canberra show on 26 February 2022). The Norwest Thunderdogs 1 team consisted of Ivy (Australian Kelpie), Link (Koolie), Inferno (Border Collie), and 9 inch height dog Swift (Koolie) .

British

 The current BFA record is 14.62 seconds and is held by F.O.C.U.S Flyball Team (set in Warrington on 18th March 2023) which they have broken 3 times! 
 The current UKFL record is 14.53 seconds and is held by Tails We Win (set in Oswestry, Shropshire on 11 September 2021).
 The current Crufts Flyball record is 14.27 seconds and is held by Roadrunners Beep Beep, set 11 March 2023. They are also the first non-UK team to win the Crufts flyball tournament, and on their first attempt.

Belgian

 The current Belgian record is 15.11 seconds and is held by Roadrunners Flyball Team based at Zonhoven. It was set at Putte on 29 September 2019. Roadrunners Beep Beep, part of The Roadrunners flyball team, attained the record using a height dog, jump height 22.5 cm. The record was set outdoors at a Super Cup competition.

Poland

 The current Polish record is 14.84 seconds and is held by Fractal Flyball Team based at Gdańsk. It was set in Gdańsk on 19 September 2021.

EFC
 The current record by European Flyball Championships ruling is 15.31 seconds and is held by Roadrunners flyballteam from Zonhoven, Belgium and was set at EFC 2018 in Poland. The EFC tournament is an outdoor competition.

North American

 The current U-FLI record is 14.182 seconds and is held by Touch N Go. It was set on 12 April 2014 in Hurricane, Utah.
 The current NAFA Regular record is 14.433 seconds and is held by Border Patrol. It was set on 5 June 2016 in Rockton, ON.

Governing bodies 
 USA and Canada: The first flyball organization, the North American Flyball Association (NAFA), was created to design uniform competition rules and to promote the sport.
 USA and Canada: North American Flyball Association (NAFA) United Flyball League International (U-FLI).
 Canada: The main flyball organization is the North American Flyball Association (NAFA).
 United Kingdom. There are 2 organisations in the UK : - The British Flyball Association (BFA) formed in 1994.-The UK UK flyball league (UKFL) which was formed in December 2017.
 Australia: The sport is overseen by the Australian Flyball Association (AFA).
 Belgium: The main flyball organization is the Belgische Flyball Belge (BFB).
 South Africa: The main flyball organization is the South African Flyball Dog Association (SAFDA).

See also 
 Championship (dog)
 Dog sports

References

External links

 
Australian Flyball Association
 British Flyball Association
 Flyball Teams and Information
 Guinness World Records Largest Flyball Tournament

Dog sports